Ylen aamu-tv (also Yle aamu-tv and Aamu-TV) is a Finnish TV morning news and magazine programme directed by Annina Enbuske and Erja Ollonen which has been broadcast on Yle TV1 in Finland since 3 March 1997. The programme is relayed outside of Finland by TV Finland, which is available terrestrially in parts of Sweden.

Hosts
 Mikko Haapanen
 Juha Hietanen
 Sari Huovinen
 Anna Lehmusvesi
 Teresa Meriläinen
 Sanna Ukkola
 Nicklas Wancke

Former hosts

 Heikki Ali-Hokka
 Jan Andersson
 Hilla Blomberg
 Annika Damström
 Kirsi Heikel
 Sari Helin
 Markus Hippi
 Jakke Holvas
 Ari Hursti (Saturday programs) 
 Tomi Korhonen
 Katri Makkonen
 Riina Malhotra
 Kati Niemeläinen (ps. Parkkonen)
 Jukka Niva
 Arto Nyberg
 Leena Pakkanen
 Jussi-Pekka Rantanen
 Leo Riski
 Mika Saarelainen
 Marja Sannikka
 Päivi Saharinen (ps. Storgård)
 Heta-Leena Sierilä
 Seppo Toivonen
 Seija Vaaherkumpu (ps. Rautio)
 Katri Viippola
 Anu Vilkman
 Kirsi Virtanen (Saturday programs)
 Matti Virtanen

Anchors
 Tommy Fränti
 Anne-Pauliina Rytkönen
 Tuulia Thynell
 Hanna Visala

Weather
 Joonas Koskela
 Elina Lopperi
 Kerttu Kotakorpi
 Toni Hellinen
 Matti Huutonen
 Seija Paasonen

Visitors
Pasi Heikura ... himself (4 episodes, 2003–2004) 
Reko Lundán ... himself (4 episodes, 2003–2004) 
Tuomas Enbuske ... himself (4 episodes, 2004) 
Taina West ... herself (3 episodes, 2004–2005)

See also
TV-nytt

External links
 
Homepage 

Finland-Swedish television shows
Finnish television news shows
1997 Finnish television series debuts
1990s Finnish television series
2000s Finnish television series
2010s Finnish television series
Yle original programming